Alamgir Alam is an Indian politician. He is a four-term MLA for Pakaur constituency in the Jharkhand Vidhan Sabha as a member of the Indian National Congress. Alam has been elected to the Jharkhand assembly in the 2000, 2004, 2014 and 2019 elections while he lost in the 2009 elections. Alam served as the Speaker of the Jharkhand assembly between October 20, 2006 and December 12, 2009.

In the 2019 Jharkhand Legislative Assembly election, Alam retained his seat, defeating Akil Akhtar, who had previously held the seat following the 2009 elections. Following the elections in which Congress emerged victorious alongside its coalition partners JMM and RJD, Alam was elected the leader of the Congress Legislature Party. On December 29, 2019, Alam was among the initial four members sworn into the state Cabinet along with Chief Minister Hemant Soren, Rameshwar Oraon and Satyanand Bhokta.

References

Indian National Congress politicians from Jharkhand
Speakers of the Jharkhand Legislative Assembly
Living people
Year of birth missing (living people)
Jharkhand MLAs 2000–2005
Jharkhand MLAs 2005–2009
Jharkhand MLAs 2014–2019
Jharkhand MLAs 2019–2024